Peter Kraus (born 1939) is an Austrian singer and actor.

Peter Kraus or Krause may also refer to:

Peter Kraus (field hockey) (born 1941), German field hockey player
Peter Kraus (athlete) (1932–2016), German Olympic sprinter
Peter S. Kraus, American businessman, philanthropist and art collector
Peter Krause (born 1965), American television and film actor
Peter Krause (German Dubbing Actor) (born 1957), German voice actor, who was the official voice for Donald Duck in Germany from 1988-2019.
Peter Krause (artist), American comic book artist
Peter Kraus, a contestant on The Bachelorette

See also
Peter Krausz (born 1946), Romanian-born Canadian artist